Dalibor Mitrović (born October 1980) is a Serbian football defender.

References

1980 births
Living people
Sportspeople from Leskovac
Association football defenders
Serbian footballers
FK Rad players
FK BSK Borča players
FK Bežanija players
FK Dinamo Vranje players
FK Mladi Radnik players
Serbian SuperLiga players